Myron Dupree (born October 15, 1961) is a former American football defensive back. He played for the Denver Broncos in 1983.

References

1961 births
Living people
American football defensive backs
North Carolina Central Eagles football players
Denver Broncos players